Pelodesis is a genus of moths of the family Erebidae. The genus was erected by George Hampson in 1926.

Species
Pelodesis fulgens (Schaus, 1912) Costa Rica
Pelodesis viridifera Hampson, 1926 Panama

References

Calpinae